The 1922 All-Western college football team consists of American football players selected to the All-Western teams chosen by various selectors for the 1922 college football season.

All-Western selections

Ends
 Bernard Kirk, Michigan (WE-1)
 Gus Tebell, Wisconsin (WE-1)
 Max Kadesky, Iowa (WE-2)
 Paul G. Goebel, Michigan (WE-2)

Tackles
 Bub Weller, Nebraska (WE-1)
 Marty Below, Wisconsin (WE-1) (CFHOF)
 George Thompson, Iowa (WE-2)
 Stanley Muirhead, Michigan (WE-2)

Guards
 Jim McMillen, Illinois (WE-1)
 Ed Degree, Notre Dame (WE-1)
 Ray Hahn, Kansas State (WE-2)
 Paul Minick, Iowa (WE-2)

Centers
 Ralph King, Chicago (WE-1)
 John C. Heldt, Iowa (WE-2)

Quarterbacks
 Rollie Williams, Wisconsin (WE-1)
 Irwin Uteritz, Michigan (WE-2)

Halfbacks
 Earl Martineau, Minnesota (WE-1)
 Harry Kipke, Michigan (WE-1) (CFHOF)
 Bill Boelter, Drake (WE-2)
 Jimmy Pyott, Chicago (WE-2)

Fullbacks
 Gordon Locke, Iowa (WE-1) (CFHOF)
 Franklin Cappon, Michigan (WE-2)

Key
WE = Walter Eckersall in the Chicago Tribune

CFHOF = College Football Hall of Fame

See also
1922 College Football All-America Team

References

1922 Big Ten Conference football season
All-Western college football teams